{{DISPLAYTITLE:C26H38O4}}
The molecular formula C26H38O4 may refer to:

 Desoxycorticosterone pivalate
 Gestonorone caproate
 Oxabolone cipionate